Pardomima viettealis is a moth of the family Crambidae. It occurs in La Réunion and Mauritius.

References
Martin, E. L. 1956a. A new species of Pardomima from Mauritius (Lep., Pyraustidae). - Revue française d'Entomologie (N. S.) 23:189–190.

Moths described in 1956
Spilomelinae